Attacobius is a genus of South American corinnid sac spiders first described by Cândido Firmino de Mello-Leitão in 1925.

Species
 it contains sixteen species, one from Argentina and the rest from Brazil:
Attacobius attarum (Roewer, 1935) – Brazil
Attacobius blakei Bonaldo & Brescovit, 2005 – Brazil
Attacobius carimbo Pereira-Filho, Saturnino & Bonaldo, 2018 – Brazil
Attacobius carranca Bonaldo & Brescovit, 2005 – Brazil
Attacobius demiguise Pereira-Filho, Saturnino & Bonaldo, 2018 – Brazil
Attacobius kitae Bonaldo & Brescovit, 2005 – Brazil
Attacobius lamellatus Bonaldo & Brescovit, 2005 – Brazil
Attacobius lauricae Pereira-Filho, Saturnino & Bonaldo, 2018 – Brazil
Attacobius lavape Bonaldo, Pesquero & Brescovit, 2018 – Brazil
Attacobius luederwaldti (Mello-Leitão, 1923) (type) – Brazil
Attacobius nigripes (Mello-Leitão, 1942) – Argentina
Attacobius thalitae Pereira-Filho, Saturnino & Bonaldo, 2018 – Brazil
Attacobius tremembe Pereira-Filho, Saturnino & Bonaldo, 2018 – Brazil
Attacobius tucurui Bonaldo & Brescovit, 2005 – Brazil
Attacobius uiriri Bonaldo & Brescovit, 2005 – Brazil
Attacobius verhaaghi Bonaldo & Brescovit, 1998 – Brazil

References

Araneomorphae genera
Corinnidae
Spiders of Argentina
Spiders of Brazil
Taxa named by Cândido Firmino de Mello-Leitão